Teucrium botrys, the cutleaf germander or cut-leaved germander is a low to short downy annual, sometimes biennial, plant. It was noted by Carl Linnaeus in 1753 and is classified as part of the genus Teucrium in the family Lamiaceae. It has oval, but deeply cut leaves, which appear almost pinnate in form. Its flowers are two-lipped but with the upper lip diminutive. They are pink to purple and form from the stem at the base of the leaves, in whorls. It is in flower in the northern hemisphere from  June to October. It prefers limy soils and bare stony ground. It is native to Western Europe, especially France and Germany. It has been introduced into north-eastern North America.

References

External links
"Teucrium botrys L.". Encyclopedia of Life, available from "http://www.eol.org/pages/579680". Accessed 14 May 2011.
Teucrium botrys L. Sp. Pl. ed. 1 562 (1753)  Flora Italiana. Accessed May 2011
Cutleaf Germander Biopix photo images. Accessed May 2011
Teucrium botrys Linnaeus The Linnaean Plant Name Typification Project, Natural History Museum, London, Accessed May 2011

botrys
Plants described in 1753
Taxa named by Carl Linnaeus